Rémi Beaulieu-Tinker (born February 20 1985 in Sherbrooke, Quebec, Canada) is a former Canadian short track speed skater.

Beaulieu-Tinker participated at multiple World Cup competitions between 2008 and 2012. He achieved three personal podiums as well as three victories and another six podiums in relay competitions. His best personal finish was second in 500m in Changchun during the 2010–11 season. He was last active in August 2013 when he tried to be selected for the Canadian national team but he did not manage to do that.

He studied at the University of Quebec in Montreal. After finishing his sporting career he was active as a researcher in a project of the Department of Kinanthropology of the University of Quebec in Montreal.

World Cup podiums

References

External links
 ISU profile
 Profile at shorttrackonline.info
 Profile at the-sports.org

1985 births
Living people
Canadian male short track speed skaters
Sportspeople from Quebec